Mohammad Mehdi Mohebi (born February 10, 2000) is an Iranian footballer who plays as a winger for Iranian club Paykan in the Persian Gulf Pro League.

Club career

Naft Masjed Soleyman
He made his debut for Naft Masjed Soleyman in first fixtures of 2020–21 Persian Gulf Pro League against Tractor.

Paykan
On 28 August 2021, Mohebi moved to Paykan. He made his debut for Paykan in first fixtures of 2021–22 Persian Gulf Pro League against Naft Masjed Soleyman.

References

Living people
2000 births
Association football wingers
Iranian footballers
Esteghlal F.C. players
Naft Masjed Soleyman F.C. players
Paykan F.C. players